HD 191760 is a star in the southern constellation of Telescopium. It has a yellow hue but is too dim to be visible to the naked eye with an apparent visual magnitude of 8.26. The star is located at a distance of approximately 296 light years from the Sun based on parallax, but is drifting closer with a radial velocity of −30 km/s.

The stellar classification of G3IV/V is consistent with a star that is evolving onto the subgiant branch, having exhausted the supply of hydrogen at its core. It is roughly four billion years old with a modest projected rotational velocity of 2.3 km/s. The star is 28% more massive than the Sun and 62% as large. The metallicity, or abundance of heavier elements, is higher than in the Sun. The star is radiating 2.7 times the luminosity of the Sun from its photosphere at an effective temperature of 5,794 K.

This is an unusual distance from the star that has been termed the 'brown dwarf desert'. The upper limit on the mass of this object is 28% of the mass of the Sun.

References

G-type subgiants
Brown dwarfs
Telescopium (constellation)
Durchmusterung objects
191760
099661